Valerio Spadoni (born July 22, 1950 in Lugo) is an Italian football coach and former professional player who played as a forward.

He played for 4 seasons (80 games, 12 goals) in Serie A for Roma.

His first stint in Serie A for Atalanta ended without him playing any games due to injuries sustained in a car accident. His Roma career ended with another serious injury he suffered on January 25, 1976 in a collision with Graziano Bini of Internazionale.

Currently runs a comic book store in Lugo.

References

1950 births
Living people
People from Lugo, Emilia-Romagna
Italian footballers
Association football forwards
Serie A players
Atalanta B.C. players
Rimini F.C. 1912 players
A.S. Roma players
Italian football managers
Footballers from Emilia-Romagna
Sportspeople from the Province of Ravenna